Chisa Hutchinson is an American playwright. Her plays have won multiple awards including the 2010 GLAAD Award, a Lilly Award in 2010, as well as a Lanford Wilson Award in 2015. She was a Lark Fellow as well as a Dramatist Guild Fellow in 2010–11. She was also a cast member of the Neo-Futurists in New York. Hutchinson was a staff writer for the Blue Man Group. She has been a member of New Dramatists for four years. Currently she is a Humanitas Fellow and the Tow Foundation Fellow at Second Stage. Hutchinson teaches creative writing at the University of Delaware. Most recently her play Somebody's Daughter was included on the 2017 Kilroys List which includes un-produced plays by female and trans playwrights.

Early life
Chisa Hutchinson was born in Queens, New York in 1980. At the age of four she was unofficially adopted by a family in Newark, New Jersey. At the age of 14 Hutchinson relocated to the Short Hills section of Millburn, New Jersey to attend Kent Place School. It is here that she was exposed to theatre for the first time. While attending high school, her drama teacher took her to attend a debate between August Wilson and Robert Brustein which inspired her to write African American centric theatre.

Education
Hutchinson attended Vassar College where she received a B.A. in Dramatic Arts. She would later go to earn her M.F.A. in Dramatic Writing from Tisch School of the Arts.

At Vassar College, Hutchinson was the only Black drama major. Because her education was not exploring theatre by Black writers, Hutchinson felt compelled to create her own work.

Themes
Hutchinson's work centers around responding to social issues, although she states that, "the best way to write a play about a social issue is to not make it about a social issue." Her plays tell stories of people that are rarely seen on stage, such as transgender stories or stories of people of color.

In interview she stated

Plays
She Likes Girls (Lark Play Development Center, Working Man's Clothes)
Mama's Gonna Buy You (Inge Center for the Arts)
This is not the Play (Mad Dog Theatre Company, Cleveland Public Theater)
Sex on Sunday (Lark Play Development Center, the BE Company)
Tunde's Trumpet (Summer Stage, BOOM Arts)
The Subject (Atlantic Theatre Company, Playwrights' Foundation, Victory Gardens Theater, Partial Comfort, and Rattlestick Playwrights Theater)
Somebody's Daughter (Cherry Lane Theatre, Second Stage)
Alondra Was Here (the Wild Project)
The Wedding Gift (Contemporary American Theatre Festival, Forward Flux)
Dead & Breathing (Lark Play Development Center, National Black Theater)

Awards
GLAAD Award (2010)
Lilly Award (2010)
New York Innovative Theatre Award (2012)
Paul Green Award (2013)
Helen Merrill Award (2013)
Lanford Wilson Award (2015)

Personal life
After the opening of her play She Likes Girls in 2008 Hutchinson's sexuality was put into the spotlight because the play centers around a young lesbian woman. Hutchinson however self identifies as bisexual.

Critical reception
Hutchinson's play She Likes Girls centers around a young lesbian couple at an inter-city high school. This play and the topics it deals with would lead her to receive a GLAAD (Gay and Lesbian Alliance Against Defamation) Award. Not only did the play win this award but it received positive reviews throughout its run in New York City.

References

External links
Official website

1980 births
Living people
American women dramatists and playwrights
Kent Place School alumni
Vassar College alumni
Tisch School of the Arts alumni
African-American women writers
University of Delaware faculty
People from Queens, New York
People from Millburn, New Jersey